The 1978 Alabama gubernatorial election took place on November 7, 1978, to elect the governor of Alabama. Incumbent Democratic Governor George Wallace did not run for re-election. Fob James, a businessman who had switched from the Republican Party to the Democratic Party and campaigned as a "born-again Democrat", won the Democratic primary in an upset over Attorney General Bill Baxley. He went on to defeat Guy Hunt in a landslide in the general election. Incumbent Democrat George Wallace was term limited and could not seek a third consecutive term.

Democratic primary

Candidates
 Bill Baxley, Attorney General of Alabama
 Jere Beasley, Lieutenant Governor
 Albert Brewer, former Governor
 Jim Folsom, former Governor
 K. C. Foster
 Horace Howell
 Fob James, businessman
 Sid McDonald, State Senator
 Bob Muncaster
 Shorty Price, perennial candidate
 Fred Sandefer
 Cornelia Wallace, former First Lady of Alabama
 Charles Woods, businessman and perennial candidate

Results
Despite entering the race as a former Republican with low name identification and little political experience, by the time of the primary, James led Baxley, Beasley, and Brewer, who were considered the main contenders, in the polls. James placed first in the primary, followed by Baxley. Fob James then won the primary runoff against Bill Baxley.

Republican primary

Candidates
 Guy Hunt, former Cullman County Probate Judge

Results

General election

Results

Fob James won all but two counties: Cullman, where Hunt had been Probate Judge; and Winston, a traditionally Republican stronghold.

References

External links

Gubernatorial
1978
Alabama
November 1978 events in the United States